John P. Bilbrey ("J.P") was the president and CEO of The Hershey Company from May 17, 2011, to March 2017

Career
In addition to his work as the president and CEO of The Hershey Company, Bilbrey also is a director of the company. Bilbrey was the interim president and CEO for a month in April and May 2011 after David J. West resigned. He was previously the executive vice president and COO of Hershey from November 2, 2010, until May 17, 2011. He was the president of North America at The Hershey Company from December 2007 until November 2010 and was the senior vice president from November 2005 until November 2010. Before his work at Hershey, he held executive jobs at Mission Foods and Danone Waters of North America Inc. He spent 22 years at The Procter & Gamble Co. where he worked in both U. domestic business and in international assignments.

Education
Bilbrey has a bachelor's degree in psychology from Kansas State University, where he ran track and was a member of Delta Sigma Phi.

Director roles
Bilbrey has been a director at McCormick & Co. Inc. since November 22, 2005, and a director of The Hershey Company since June 2011.

References

American chief executives of food industry companies
Kansas State University alumni
Living people
Procter & Gamble people
Year of birth missing (living people)